Tamar Khmiadashvili (27 November 1944 – 2019) was a Georgian chess player, who was awarded the title of Woman Grandmaster (WGM) by FIDE in 1998. She won the Georgian Women's Championship in 1972, 1975 and 1978, the European Women's Senior Championship in 2010, and the World Women's Senior Championship in 1998, 1999, 2003, 2010 and 2017 (in the 65+ age category). She placed second in the latter event in 1995–1997. In 2007 she was also accorded the FIDE Arbiter title.

Khmiadashvili was fluent in German. She worked as a chess coach in her native city of Tbilisi and was never married.

References

External links

 
 
 

1944 births
2019 deaths
Female chess players from Georgia (country)
Soviet female chess players
Chess woman grandmasters
Sportspeople from Tbilisi
World Senior Chess Champions
Date of death missing
Place of death missing